12 is the twelfth solo studio album by Ryuichi Sakamoto. It was released on January 17, 2023, through Milan Records and Commmons.

Composition 
12 has been noted to be an "unhurried" minimalist electronic album that features the "sound of him breathing as though engaged in strenuous activity" overlayed on "sparse piano pieces within electronic soundscapes imbued with a sobering weight."

Critical reception

At Metacritic, which assigns a weighted rating out of 100 to reviews from mainstream critics, the album has an average score of 89 based on seven reviews, indicating "universal acclaim". The Skinny gave 12 a 5-star review, nothing that, unlike his previous works, 12 is a "collection instead deals in the turbulent and unpredictable period that comes before the unknown." IN a positive review, Pitchfork highlights how "Rarely does an album this understated say so much."

Track listing

Charts

Weekly charts

Monthly charts

References

2023 albums
Milan Records albums
Ryuichi Sakamoto albums